Hynek Zohorna (born 1 August 1990) is a Czech professional ice hockey player. He currently plays with IK Oskarshamn in the Swedish Hockey League (SHL).

Zohorna made his Czech Extraliga debut playing with HC Kometa Brno debut during the 2011–12 Czech Extraliga season.

Career statistics

Regular season and playoffs

International

References

External links

1990 births
Living people
Amur Khabarovsk players
Czech ice hockey forwards
HC Dynamo Pardubice players
HC Kometa Brno players
Lahti Pelicans players
IK Oskarshamn players
Sportspeople from Havlíčkův Brod
Ice hockey players at the 2022 Winter Olympics
Olympic ice hockey players of the Czech Republic
Czech expatriate ice hockey players in Russia
Czech expatriate ice hockey players in Sweden
Czech expatriate ice hockey players in Finland